Under Wartime Conditions is the seventh album by English musician Martin Newell, under the alias The Cleaners from Venus, released in 1984 by record labels Acid Tapes, Calypso Now and Man at the Off Licence.

Reception 

Trouser Press called it "rudimentary and casual, but musically substantial and indicative of anything-goes pop talent". Pitchfork wrote: "If anything, [Under Wartime Conditions] proved his most enjoyably rollicking record yet".

Track listing

References

External links 

 

1984 albums